Asuboni No.3 is a town located in the Kwahu West Municipal District of the Eastern Region of Ghana.

References 

Populated places in the Eastern Region (Ghana)